The 2017 NCAA Division III men's basketball tournament is a single-elimination tournament involving 64 teams to determine the men's collegiate basketball national champion of National Collegiate Athletic Association (NCAA) Division III.  The tournament concluded with the national semifinal and championship rounds that took place at the Salem Civic Center in Salem, Virginia.

Babson beat Augustana (IL) 79-78 to win their 1st national title. Joey Flannery was voted as the MVP of the tournament.

Qualifying teams

Automatic bids (43)

The following 43 teams were automatic qualifiers for the 2017 NCAA field by virtue of winning their conference's automatic bid (except for the UAA, whose regular-season champion received the automatic bid).

At-large bids (21)

The following 21 teams were awarded qualification for the 2017 NCAA field by the NCAA Division III Men's Basketball Committee. The committee evaluated teams on the basis of their win-loss percentage, strength of schedule, head-to-head results, results against common opponents, and results against teams included in the NCAA's final regional rankings.

Tournament bracket

Top-left - Marietta, Ohio

Bottom-left - Babson Park, Massachusetts

Top-right - Middlebury, Vermont

Bottom-right - Holland, Michigan

Final Four - Salem, Virginia

See also
2017 NCAA Division I men's basketball tournament
2017 NCAA Division II men's basketball tournament

References

NCAA Division III men's basketball tournament
Ncaa Tournament
NCAA Division III Men's Basketball